A City's Child is a 1972 Australian film directed by Brian Kavanagh.

Plot
A spinster whose invalid mother dies starts drifting into a fantasy world. She starts collecting Barbie dolls and meets a young man who may or may not be real. The two of them become lovers.

Cast
Monica Maughan as the woman
Sean Scully as the man
Moira Carlteon as the mother
Vivean Gray as first neighbour
Marguerite Lofthouse as second neighbour
Beverley Heath as shopgirl
Michael Howell as doctor
Roger Scales as man on beach
Donna Drake as girl on beach
Mary Marshall as woman on train

Production
The film was shot on 16mm with some financial assistance from the Experimental Film and Television Fund. Shooting took place over four weeks, half in a small studio belonging to Cambridge Films, half on location in various suburbs. After completion of filming, the Australian Film Development Corporation provided $5,000 to enable the film to be blown up to 35mm.

Release
The film played in the London, Edinburgh, Chicago and Sydney Film Festivals. Monica Maugham won Best Female Actor at the 1972 AFI Awards. However the film was not widely screened, in part because the movie was refused registration under the quality clause of the New South Wales Film Quota Act.

References

External links

A City's Child at Oz Movies

1972 films
Australian drama films
1970s English-language films
1972 drama films
1970s Australian films